Cameron Gilchrist (born 29 July 1997) is a Scottish professional footballer who plays as a defender.

Career
Gilchrist played youth football for Leicester City and Swansea City, and made one appearance in the Scottish Premiership for Inverness Caledonian Thistle during the 2016–17 season. After signing for Barwell, he moved to AFC Rushden & Diamonds in October 2017 on dual registration terms, having made 4 league appearances for Barwell.

He moved on loan from AFC Rushden & Diamonds to Hinckley in late September 2018, He left AFC Rushden & Diamonds a few days later, having made 9 league appearances for them. He made two league appearances for Hinckley.

Notes

References

1997 births
Living people
Scottish footballers
Leicester City F.C. players
Swansea City A.F.C. players
Inverness Caledonian Thistle F.C. players
Barwell F.C. players
AFC Rushden & Diamonds players
Hinckley A.F.C. players
Scottish Professional Football League players
Association football defenders